Fantastic Four (sometimes stylized as Fantastic 4) is a 2005 American superhero film based on the Marvel Comics superhero team of the same name, created by Stan Lee and Jack Kirby. It was directed by Tim Story, and released by 20th Century Fox. The film stars Ioan Gruffudd, Jessica Alba, Chris Evans, Michael Chiklis, Julian McMahon and Kerry Washington.

This was the second live-action Fantastic Four film to be filmed. A previous attempt, titled The Fantastic Four, was a B-movie produced by Roger Corman that ultimately went unreleased. Fantastic Four was released in the United States on July 8, 2005. Despite receiving generally mixed reviews from critics, it grossed over $333 million worldwide and was a box office success. A sequel, Fantastic Four: Rise of the Silver Surfer, was released in 2007. A reboot was released in 2015.

Plot
Dr. Reed Richards, along with his friend, Ben Grimm, convinces Dr. Victor Von Doom, CEO of Von Doom Industries, to allow him access to his space station to test the effects of exposure of clouds of cosmic energy on biological samples. Von Doom agrees, and recruits his chief genetics researcher (and Reed's ex-girlfriend) Susan Storm and her reckless brother Johnny Storm.

They arrive in space to study the cosmic clouds, but the clouds arrive ahead of schedule. Reed, Susan, and Johnny leave the shielded station to rescue Ben, out on a space-walk to place the samples, while Victor closes the shields behind them to keep himself protected. The storm breaks through the station and strikes the four. They return home but soon begin to develop strange powers. Reed is able to stretch like rubber, Susan can become invisible and create force fields, Johnny can engulf himself in fire, and Ben is transformed into a large, rock-based creature with superhuman strength and durability. Victor meanwhile faces a backlash from his stockholders due to the publicity from the failed mission.

On the Brooklyn Bridge, Ben accidentally causes a traffic pile-up while stopping a man from committing suicide. The four use their various powers to contain the damage and save lives. While the public cheer them for their efforts, Ben's fiancee arrives to silently split their engagement, unable to accept him for his condition. Reed vows to a heartbroken Ben to reverse the effects. The media dubs them "The Fantastic Four," and Victor exploits the news story to his stockholders, but they decide to pull out of Von Doom Industries. The four move into Reed's lab in the Baxter Building to study their abilities and work on finding a cure. Victor offers his support in their efforts, but blames Reed for the mission's failure.

Reed plans to construct a machine to re-create the storm and reverse their conditions. However, Johnny refuses to cooperate, insisting they should just embrace that their powers. Meanwhile, Victor, having also been affected by the storm due to the shields' malfunctioning, begins mutating into organic metal and is able to produce electricity, and begins plotting to use his new powers to take his revenge. 

Victor drives a wedge between Ben and Reed, resulting in Ben walking out in rage. This motivates Reed to attempt the machine on himself, but he cannot generate enough power to push the storm to critical mass. Victor hears this, and brings Ben to the lab. Ben is placed in the machine and Doom uses his abilities to produce the electricity needed to power it, turning Ben back to normal and accelerating Doom's condition, causing much of his body to turn to metal. Victor knocks Ben unconscious and kidnaps Reed.

Victor, now calling himself "Doom," tortures Reed using a super-cooling unit and fires a heat-seeking missile at the Baxter Building to kill Johnny. He flies through the city to evade it, lighting a garbage barge on fire to trick it. Sue rushes to free Reed and battles Doom but is outmatched. Ben arrives to help, transformed into The Thing again by reusing the machine. The battle spills into the streets, and the four assemble to battle Doom. Johnny and Susan combine their powers to wrap Doom in an inferno of intense heat, and Ben and Reed douse him with cold water, inducing thermal shock and freezing Doom in place.

In an epilogue, Ben tells Reed to forget about his experiment with the machine, as he has accepted his condition through his relationship with Alicia Masters, a blind artist. The team decide to embrace their roles as superheroes, and Reed proposes to Sue. Meanwhile, a frozen Doom is transported back to his homeland of Latveria.

Cast
 Ioan Gruffudd as Reed Richards / Mr. Fantastic
 Jessica Alba as Susan Storm / Invisible Woman
 Chris Evans as Johnny Storm / Human Torch
 Michael Chiklis as Ben Grimm / Thing
 Julian McMahon as Victor Von Doom / Doctor Doom
 Hamish Linklater as Leonard
 Kerry Washington as Alicia Masters
 Laurie Holden as Debbie McIlvane
 Kevin McNulty as Jimmy O'Hoolihan
 Maria Menounos as Nurse
 Michael Kopsa as Ned Cecil
 Stan Lee as Willie Lumpkin

As in almost all of the previous Marvel Comics-based films, Fantastic Four co-creator Stan Lee makes a cameo appearance. He is Willie Lumpkin, the postal worker who greets the team on their way to the Baxter Building elevator. Hugh Jackman reprises his role as James Howlett / Logan / Wolverine from the X-Men film series in a scene in which Reed Richards changes his face to resemble Jackman's portrayal of Wolverine in an attempt to woo Susan Storm; the scene was deleted from the theatrical cut of Fantastic Four and was restored in the "Extended Cut" of the film.  Canadian broadcasters Terry David Mulligan and Ben Mulroney, and American broadcaster Lauren Sánchez make cameos as reporters. Cameos during the X Games scenes include professional freestyle motocross riders Kenny Bartram and Brian Deegan, and reporter Jamie Little. David Parker and Pascale Hutton appeared as Ernie and Nightclub Girlfriend, respectively.

Production
In 1983, German producer Bernd Eichinger met with Stan Lee at his home in Los Angeles to explore obtaining an option for a movie based on the Fantastic Four. The option was not available until three years later, when Eichinger's Constantin Film company obtained it from Marvel Comics for a price the producer called "not enormous", and which has been estimated to be $250,000. Warner Bros. and Columbia Pictures showed interest, but were cautious of Eichinger's $40–45 million budget. With the option scheduled to expire on December 31, 1992, Eichinger asked Marvel for an extension. With none forthcoming, Eichinger planned to retain his option by producing a low-budget Fantastic Four film, reasoning, he said in 2005, "They didn't say I had to make a big movie." In 1992 he approached B-movie specialist Roger Corman on the idea of producing the film on a $5 million budget in order to keep the rights, which he eventually decided to bring down to $1 million. In 1994, the adaptation, titled The Fantastic Four, had its trailer released to theaters, and its cast and director went on a promotional tour, however the film was not officially released. The film was accused of being an ashcan copy, meaning it was only made to keep the license. Lee and Eichinger stated that the actors had no idea of the situation, instead believing they were creating a proper release. Marvel Comics paid in exchange for the film's negative, so 20th Century Fox could go ahead with the big-budget adaptation, as well as a possible spin-off film starring the Silver Surfer for summer 1998.

Now under production by Avi Arad and Ralph Winter, Fox hired Chris Columbus to write and direct Fantastic Four in 1995. He developed a screenplay with Michael France, but decided to step down as director and focus on producing Fantastic Four under his 1492 Pictures company. Peter Segal was hired to direct in April 1997, and was replaced by Sam Weisman by the end of the year. Fox brought in Sam Hamm to rewrite the script in April 1998 in an attempt to lower the $165 million projected budget. In February 1999, with development taking longer than expected, Eichinger and Fox signed a deal with Marvel to extend the control of the film rights for another two years, with a summer 2001 release planned, and hiring Raja Gosnell to direct. However, Gosnell decided to do Scooby Doo instead and dropped out in October 2000. He was replaced by Peyton Reed in April 2001 and Mark Frost was brought on board for another rewrite. Reed departed in July 2003, explaining in 2015, "I developed it for the better part of a year with three different sets of writers. But it became clear after a while that Fox had a very different movie in mind and they were also chasing a release date … so we ended up parting company." Reed's version was described as being influenced by A Hard Day's Night and intended to get Alexis Denisof as Reed Richards, Charlize Theron as Susan Storm, Paul Walker as Johnny Storm, John C. Reilly as Ben Grimm and Jude Law as Victor Von Doom. Sean Astin was one of the candidates to direct the movie and he tried to secure the part of Susan Storm for either Christina Aguilera or Cameron Diaz. His reasoning for wanting to direct it, despite never having directed a feature before nor read any of the comics, was that he wanted to step up in filmmaking and felt that doing a Fantastic Four film would allow him to leave a mark. Despite not getting the job, Tom Rothman was impressed with his determination and hoped to work with him on a future project. Marvel met with Robert Downey Jr. about playing the role of Doctor Doom.

Tim Story was signed to direct in April 2004, after Fox was impressed with his early cut of Taxi and that Story is a fan of the comics. Simon Kinberg wrote uncredited drafts of the script. After seeing The Incredibles, Eichinger was ordered to make significant script changes and add more special effects because of similarities.

Release

Marketing 
The teaser trailer was shown at screenings of Elektra.
The American premiere of Fantastic Four was moved from July 1, 2005, to the week of July 8 to avoid competition with Steven Spielberg's motion picture War of the Worlds, during its first week. Fantastic Four opened in 3,602 movie theaters in the United States, and increased to 3,619 theaters in the following week.

Box office
Fantastic Four finished at the top position at the box office with $56.1 million from 3,602 theaters over its first weekend. By the end of 2005, Fantastic Four had accumulated a gross income of $330.6 million, with $154.7 million of this coming in the United States.

Critical response
The site's critical consensus reads, "Marred by goofy attempts at wit, subpar acting, and bland storytelling, Fantastic Four is a mediocre attempt to bring Marvel's oldest hero team to the big screen." On Metacritic, the film has a score of 40 out of 100 based on 35 critics, indicating "mixed or average reviews". Audiences polled by CinemaScore gave the film an average grade of "B" on an A+ to F scale.

Stephen Hunter of The Washington Post noted that it was "a movie more based on character than plot" and "mostly an origins tale". He called it "a funky, fun film version of the famous Marvel superhero[s]" but was critical of the last twenty minutes.
Joe Leydon of Variety called the film "unpretentious" but also "wildly uneven".
James Berardinelli of ReelViews having been a fan of the comics, found the film disappointing saying "This movie is more like a B-grade comic book adaptation than the A-list production it should have been." Berardinelli praised Chiklis for a standout performance despite being buried in makeup: "Fantastic Four has its good points - there are individual scenes that work" and said there are "moments of surprise and excitement...but the tempo's off, beats are missed, and the production ends up sounding out-of-tune." Entertainment Weeklys Owen Gleiberman described the film as "like something left over from the '60s" and compared it unfavorably to other contemporary films such as Spider-Man 2, Batman Begins, and The Incredibles. 
 The film has earned some warmer reevaluation due to the failure of the 2015 reboot film.

Accolades
At the Saturn Awards, Fantastic Four was nominated for Best Science Fiction Film, but lost the trophy to Star Wars: Episode III – Revenge of the Sith. It was given two nominations at the 2006 MTV Movie Awards including Best Hero for Jessica Alba (she lost to Christian Bale for Batman Begins) and Best On-Screen Team for Alba, Michael Chiklis, Chris Evans and Ioan Gruffudd (they lost to Vince Vaughn and Owen Wilson for Wedding Crashers). Alba was nominated for a Razzie Award for Worst Actress for her performances in both this film and Into the Blue, but lost to Jenny McCarthy for Dirty Love. The film won the Stinker Award for Worst Screenplay for a Film Grossing Over $100M.

Home media
The main version of Fantastic Four on VHS and DVD was released in December 2005. This version had some changes from the one shown in cinemas. Some of these changes included the following:
 There is a scene where Reed and Susan are in a storage room of the Baxter Building. On one of the shelves is a robot that is supposed to be H.E.R.B.I.E. from the Fantastic Four animated cartoon series from 1978.
 The biggest change is of the scene with Jessica Alba and Ioan Gruffudd's characters looking toward the Statue of Liberty. Similar lines are used in the DVD version, but the version on DVD replaces that with the pair in the planetarium, where they discuss their feelings for each other without an argumentative tone. The DVD includes the theatrical version as a bonus feature, but instead of Reed forming a square jaw, as he does in the theatrical version, he makes his skin look like that of Wolverine of the X-Men comics. The actor Gruffudd breaks the fourth wall and looks directly at the camera as he does this. This scene was created in hopes to create a cinematic universe between This film, Fox's X-Men and Sony's Spider-Man. Wolverine was also set to appear in a cameo in Spider-Man 2. The extended cut includes this as part of the movie, along with a longer version of the scene in the planetarium.

The movie was also released on VHS the same day, it was later released on Blu-ray on November 14, 2006.

Extended cut
In June 2007, an extended cut DVD of Fantastic Four was released. It incorporated about 20 minutes of deleted scenes, and also included a preview of the sequel, Fantastic Four: Rise of the Silver Surfer. The DVD expanded on The Thing's relationships with Alicia Masters, Doctor Doom's manipulations to break up the group, and the Human Torch's womanizing, and how it backfires.

Film novelization
Fantastic Four received a novelization written by popular Marvel Comics writer Peter David, which included several scenes not in the movie.

SoundtrackFantastic 4: The Album''' is the official soundtrack to the movie Fantastic Four. The soundtrack features two supergroups that were formed specifically for the album: Loser (former Marilyn Manson guitarist/writer John 5) and T.F.F. (featuring Brody Dalle of The Distillers, Chris Cester of Jet, Nick Zinner of The Yeah Yeah Yeahs, and Dolf de Datsun of the Datsuns).

An album of John Ottman's score was released by Varèse Sarabande on July 12, 2005.

Future
Sequel

The film had a slightly improved critical reception but lower financial gross than its predecessor.

2015 reboot

When plans for a third film fell through, 20th Century Fox rebooted the series with 2015's Fantastic Four. The film experienced a worse critical reception than the original films and failed at the box office, leading to the cancellation of a sequel planned for a 2017 release.

Marvel Cinematic Universe

In 2019, after Disney successfully acquired Fox, the film rights of Fantastic Four were reverted to Marvel Studios, with plans to integrate the characters, along with The X-Men and Deadpool, into Marvel Cinematic Universe confirmed at Marvel's 2019 San Diego Comic-Con Hall-H panel. In December 2020, Jon Watts was announced as the director. In April 2022, Watts stepped down from directing the film after expressing his desire to take a "break" from superhero films. In July 2022, it was announced that Fantastic Four'' is scheduled to be released in the United States on February 14, 2025, as the first film of Phase Six of the MCU.

See also
 Fantastic Four (2005 video game)
 Fantastic Four in film

References

External links

 
 
 
 
 Fantastic Four on Marvel.com

2005 films
2005 science fiction action films
2000s action adventure films
2000s superhero films
20th Century Fox films
1492 Pictures films
American action adventure films
American science fiction action films
American superhero films
2000s English-language films
Fantastic Four (film series)
Films about astronauts
Films about marriage
Films about scientists
Films directed by Tim Story
Films produced by Avi Arad
Films produced by Bernd Eichinger
Films produced by Ralph Winter
Films scored by John Ottman
Films set in 2005
Films set in New York City
Films shot in New Orleans
Films shot in New York City
Films shot in Toronto
Films shot in Vancouver
Radiation health effects in fiction
American science fiction adventure films
Films with screenplays by Mark Frost
Films with screenplays by Michael France
Marvel Comics film soundtracks
Doctor Doom
2000s American films
Live-action films based on Marvel Comics